The U.S. Post Office, also known as the U.S. Federal Building, is a historic post office building located at Oil City, Venango County, Pennsylvania.  It was designed by the Office of the Supervising Architect under the direction of James Knox Taylor and built in 1906, with additions built in 1912 and 1928.  It is in the Beaux Arts style. It is a steel frame building faced with limestone ashlar.

It was added to the National Register of Historic Places in 1977.

References

Oil City
Beaux-Arts architecture in Pennsylvania
Government buildings completed in 1928
Buildings and structures in Oil City, Pennsylvania
1928 establishments in Pennsylvania
National Register of Historic Places in Venango County, Pennsylvania